Leif Hammel (born 28 February 1935) is a Danish former professional racing cyclist. He rode in the 1960 Tour de France.

References

External links
 

1935 births
Living people
Danish male cyclists
Cyclists from Copenhagen